Hillyland is a suburban area of Perth, Scotland, approximately  west-northwest of the centre of Perth. It borders Tulloch, which is located to the north and northeast. Newhouse Road separates Hillyland from Letham to the east. 

Hillyland lies immediately to the east of the A9 and south of the A85 (Crieff Road).

In 1909, city reports described a "special drainage district" called Tulloch and Hillyland.

Hillyland Farm
Morris Young Ltd., a haulage company, was located in the wedge of land between Crieff and Tulloch Roads between 1952 and 2020. Its lorry fleet was visible parked atop the hill located at the former Hillyland Farm, from which the area grew. Now-demolished dwellings for the farm workers were pictured in a 1904 issue of The Architect and Contract Reporter. Robert Henderson was the farmer in 1897.

Map

References

External links 
List of Street Names in Hillyland, Perth and Kinross, United Kingdom - Geographic.org

Populated places in Perth, Scotland